Law & Order: Special Victims Unit is an American police procedural, legal, crime drama television series created and produced by Dick Wolf. The series premiered on NBC on September 20, 1999 as the first spin-off of crime drama, Law & Order. Law & Order: Special Victims Unit centers on the detectives of the Special Victims Unit in the fictional 16th Precinct of the New York City Police Department.

Law & Order: Special Victims Unit has won and been nominated for numerous awards for the series' actors, writers, and producers. Star Mariska Hargitay has been nominated for an Emmy Award many times, eventually winning it in 2006 for Outstanding Lead Actress in a Drama Series, and a Golden Globe in the category for Best Actress in a Television Drama Series, for her portrayal of Detective Olivia Benson in 2005. Hargitay also won a Gracie Allen Award for Outstanding Female Lead in a Drama Series in 2009. Hargitay is the first performer from any member of the Law & Order franchise to win an Emmy, and the first to win a Golden Globe, for an acting role on the show.

Awards and honors

References

External links
Awards for Law and Order: Special Victims Unit at the Internet Movie Database

Law & Order: Special Victims Unit
Lists of awards by television series